Gülderen Çelik (born April 13, 1980, in Istanbul, Turkey) is a Turkish karateka competing in the kumite –53 kg division. Her trainer is Turan Yılmaz.

Personal life
She was born the youngest of five children in the Mecidiyeköy neighborhood of Istanbul. Following her graduation from the high school in 2001, she enrolled in Trakya University to study physical education. Immediately after finishing the university, she was appointed as a teacher in a school in Istanbul, where she serves today.

Sports career
Aged only 12 years, Çelik was inspired by a neighbor's young boy performing karate. In 1992 she started in attending karate lessons given by Bahattin Kandez, a former national karate practitioner. He is still her tutor.

After having been successful at the provincial level, Çelik fought in national tournaments winning titles. At her first international participation in 1999 in Euboea, Greece, she became European bronze medalist in kumite under 53 kg division.

Since then, she has been competing at various international events with success and has been champion several times in her category.

Achievements

Individual
2012
 16th Balkan Children & Seniors karate championships in Herceg Novi, Montenegro – kumite -55 kg 

2010
 45th European Karate Senior Championships in Athens, Greece – May 7–9 – kumite -50 kg 
 20th World Senior Karate Championships – Belgrade, Serbia – October 27 – kumite -50 kg 5th

2009
 16. Mediterranean Games in Pescara, Italy – June 25-July 5 – kumite -50 kg 
 World Games in Kaohsiung, Taiwan – July 25–26 – kumite -53 kg 
 44th European Karate Senior Championships in Zagreb, Croatia – May 8–10 – kumite -50 kg 
 Dutch Open in Rotterdam, Netherlands – March 7–8 – kumite -55 kg 
2008
 19th World Championships in Tokyo, Japan – November 13–16 – kumite -53 kg 
 German Open in Hamburg, Germany – September 27–28 – kumite -53 kg 
 43rd European Championships in Tallinn, Estonia – May 2–4 – kumite -53 kg 
2007
 42nd European Championships in Bratislava, Slovakia – May 4–6 – kumite -53 kg 
 Italian Open in Monza, Italy – March 31-April 1 – kumite -53 kg 
2006
 National Championships in Antalya, Turkey – March 26–27 – kumite -53 kg 
2005
 40th European Championships in Tenerife, Spain – May 13–15 – kumite -53 kg 
 Italian Open in Monza, Italy – April 9–10 – kumite -53 kg 
2004
 4th World University Karate Championships in Belgrade, Serbia – July 10 – kumite -53 kg 
2003
 European Championships in Bremen, Germany – May 9–11 – kumite -53 kg 
1999
 European Championships in Euboea, Greece – May 20–23 – kumite -53 kg 
 National Individual Karate Tournament in Denizli, Turkey

Team
2012
 47th European Karate Senior Championships in Tenerife, Spain – May 10–13 – kumite team female 

2005
 National Clubs and European Regional Teams Championships in Yalova, Turkey – May 20 – kumite 

2004
 17th World Karate Championships in Monterrey, Mexico – November 18–21 – kumite team female 
 National Karate Clubs League Championships in Bursa, Turkey – October 10 – kumite team female 
 39th European Championships in Moscow, Russia May 7–9 – kumite team female

References

External links
 

1980 births
Living people
Sportspeople from Istanbul
Trakya University alumni
Turkish schoolteachers
Turkish female karateka
Turkish female martial artists
Kocaeli Büyükşehir Belediyesi Kağıt Spor athletes
Mediterranean Games gold medalists for Turkey
Competitors at the 2009 Mediterranean Games
World Games bronze medalists
Competitors at the 2009 World Games
Mediterranean Games medalists in karate
World Games medalists in karate
20th-century Turkish sportswomen
21st-century Turkish sportswomen